The North Army was an army level command of the German Army that existed briefly at the outbreak of World War I.

History
The North Army was formed (on the outbreak of the war) in Schleswig to defend the German North Sea Coast in case of British landings. It was dissolved by the end of August 1914 as its major units had been transferred away.

Structure
On formation, North Army consisted of
 IX Reserve Corps
with 25 infantry battalions, 5 machine gun companies (30 machine guns), 6 cavalry squadrons, 12 field artillery batteries (72 guns), 4 heavy batteries (16 guns), a Field Airship Detachment and 7 pioneer companies. It was transferred to the Western Front, joining 1st Army in late August.
 "Higher Landwehr Commander 1" (Höherer Landwehr-Kommandeur 1)
with 24 infantry battalions, 6 cavalry squadrons and 4 field artillery batteries (24 guns). Initially referred to as the Landwehr Division Goltz, after its commander; later renamed 1st Landwehr Division. By 27 August, it had joined the 8th Army on the Eastern Front and participated in the battles of Tannenberg and 2nd Masurian Lakes.
 Coastal Protection
 IV Battalion, 75th Landwehr Infantry Regiment
 IV Battalion, 76th Landwehr Infantry Regiment
 V Battalion, 76th Landwehr Infantry Regiment
North Sea Islands (5 infantry battalions, 9 heavy batteries (36 heavy howitzers), 2 pioneer companies)
Borkum
I and II Battalions, 79th Reserve Infantry Regiment
2nd Abteilung, 2nd Foot Artillery Regiment
1st Reserve Battery, 2nd Foot Artillery Regiment
1st Landwehr Pioneer Company of X Corps District
Sylt
I and II Battalions, 85th Landwehr Infantry Regiment
a Battery of 1st Abteilung, 2nd Foot Artillery Regiment
2nd Reserve Battery, 2nd Foot Artillery Regiment
1st Landwehr Pioneer Company of IX Corps District
Pellworm
III Battalion, 85th Landwehr Infantry Regiment
a Battery of 1st Abteilung, 2nd Foot Artillery Regiment
3rd Reserve Battery, 2nd Foot Artillery Regiment

Glossary
Armee-Abteilung, or Army Detachment, in the sense of "something detached from an Army". It is not under the command of an Army so is, in itself, a small Army.
Armee-Gruppe, or Army Group, in the sense of a group within an Army and under its command; generally formed as a temporary measure for a specific task.
Heeresgruppe, or Army Group, in the sense of a number of armies under a single commander.

See also 

Order of battle at Tannenberg

References

Bibliography 
 
 
 

N
Military units and formations established in 1914
Military units and formations disestablished in 1914